Willy Naessens (born on 14 February 1939 in Wortegem-Petegem, East Flanders, Belgium) is a well known industrialist in Belgium. Naessens grew up in a modest family.

At a young age, he started a construction business called "Naessens Constructions", specializing in constructing big - but rather economised - industrial buildings and swimming pools. He became one of the most powerful Belgian industrialists. Nowadays, his corporate group participates in many branches of the construction sector, and in non-construction businesses, such as restaurants and sports-teams.

Nevertheless, he always gave a share to charity. For instance, he became very popular by paying a very expensive organ transplantation for a Belgian child.

References

External links

 Willy Naessens Group

1939 births
Living people
Belgian businesspeople
People from East Flanders